Ahmad Maher Wridat (born 22 July 1991) is a Palestinian footballer who plays as a forward for Shabab Al-Dhahiriya and the Palestine national football team. He holds the honor of being the first Palestinian to score in the AFC Champions League having scored in Al-Wehdat's 2–1 win over Bengaluru FC in February 2017.

International career
On 6 September 2014, Wridat helped Palestine to take third place in the Philippines Peace Cup after scoring four goals against Chinese Taipei, including three in extra time to finish top scorer with five goals.

International goals
Scores and results list Palestine's goal tally first.

International goals U-23
Scores and results list Palestine's goal tally first.

Honours

Shabab Al-Dhahiriya
West Bank Premier League: 2012–13

Individual
Philippine Peace Cup Top Scorer: 2014

References

External links

1991 births
Living people
Palestinian footballers
Shabab Al-Dhahiriya SC players
West Bank Premier League players
Association football midfielders
Palestine international footballers
People from Hebron Governorate
Footballers at the 2014 Asian Games
Expatriate footballers in Jordan
2015 AFC Asian Cup players
Asian Games competitors for Palestine